Vratislav Petráček (22 February 1910 – 1987) was a Czech gymnast. He competed at the 1936 Summer Olympics and the 1948 Summer Olympics.

References

External links
 

1910 births
1987 deaths
Czech male artistic gymnasts
Olympic gymnasts of Czechoslovakia
Gymnasts at the 1936 Summer Olympics
Gymnasts at the 1948 Summer Olympics
Sportspeople from České Budějovice